The canton of Donnemarie-Dontilly is a French former administrative division, located in the arrondissement of Provins, in the Seine-et-Marne département (Île-de-France région). It was disbanded following the French canton reorganisation which came into effect in March 2015. It consisted of 19 communes, which joined the canton of Provins in 2015.

Demographics

Composition 
The canton of Donnemarie-Dontilly was composed of 19 communes:

Cessoy-en-Montois
Châtenay-sur-Seine
Coutençon
Donnemarie-Dontilly
Égligny
Gurcy-le-Châtel
Jutigny
Lizines
Luisetaines
Meigneux
Mons-en-Montois
Montigny-Lencoup
Paroy
Savins
Sigy
Sognolles-en-Montois
Thénisy
Villeneuve-les-Bordes
Vimpelles

See also
Cantons of the Seine-et-Marne department
Communes of the Seine-et-Marne department

References

Donnemarie dontilly
2015 disestablishments in France
States and territories disestablished in 2015